Herman Redemeijer (27 November 1930 – 29 February 2020) was a Dutch politician and educator. He served as a member of the States of Overijssel between 1979 and 1987 and subsequently in the Senate of the Netherlands between 1997 and 1995. Redemeijer was a member of the Labour Party.

Life
Redemeijer was born on 27 November 1930 in Hengelo. He chose a career in education, and was a teacher and later school principal. Redemeijer also worked for the teacher's union for ten years. From 1972 to 1987 he was a national inspector for special education.

On 22 August 1979 Redemijer became member of the States of Overijssel for the Labour Party. He served until 12 November 1987. Redemeijer had already entered the Senate of the Netherlands on 23 June 1987. In the Senate he was the Labour spokesperson for education, agriculture and development aid. He was chair of the commission of education between October 1993 and June 1995.

Redemeijer died on 29 February in Almelo, aged 89.

References

1930 births
2020 deaths
Dutch educators
Labour Party (Netherlands) politicians
Members of the Provincial Council of Overijssel
Members of the Senate (Netherlands)
People from Hengelo